Tomáš Kos (born 31 December 1967) is a Czech biathlete. He competed at the 1988, the 1992 and the 1994 Winter Olympics.

References

External links
 

1967 births
Living people
Czech male biathletes
Olympic biathletes of Czechoslovakia
Olympic biathletes of the Czech Republic
Biathletes at the 1988 Winter Olympics
Biathletes at the 1992 Winter Olympics
Biathletes at the 1994 Winter Olympics
People from Semily
Sportspeople from the Liberec Region